Panevėžys Air Base (also known as Pajuostis, and Tulpė)  is an air base in Lithuania located 6 km east of Panevėžys.  It is a transport base, with a very large ring taxiway 2 km in diameter.  There are 32 large revetments.

The main operator was 128th Guards Military Aviation Transport Regiment (128 Gv VTAP), Military Transport Aviation, flying Antonov An-22 and Il-76 aircraft.  It received USSR's first Il-76M on August 27, 1977. The 128 Gv VTAP relocated in 1992 to Orenburg.

Pajuostis airfield was operated as Lithuanian Air Force Second Air Base in 1993 - 2007. During 1993-2000 it hosted two squadrons - Fighters' Sqn. and Transport Sqn. During 2000-2007 it hosted Helicopters' Sqn.

In 2007, the Lithuanian Armed Forces ceased using the airfield.

References

Soviet Air Force bases
Lithuanian Air Force bases
Military facilities of the Soviet Union in Lithuania
Buildings and structures in Panevėžys County